Etheostoma is a genus of small freshwater fish in the family Percidae native to North America. Most are restricted to the United States, but species are also found in Canada and Mexico. They are commonly known as darters, although the term "darter" is shared by several other genera. Many can produce alarm pheromones that serve to warn nearby fish in case of an attack.

Species
The 157 recognized species in this genus are:
 Etheostoma acuticeps R. M. Bailey, 1959 (sharphead darter)
 Etheostoma akatulo Layman & Mayden, 2009 (bluemask darter)
 Etheostoma artesiae (O. P. Hay, 1881) (redspot darter)
 Etheostoma asprigene (S. A. Forbes, 1878) (mud darter)
 Etheostoma atripinne (D. S. Jordan, 1877) (Cumberland snubnose darter)
 Etheostoma australe D. S. Jordan, 1889 (Conchos darter)
 Etheostoma autumnale Mayden, 2010 (autumn darter)
 Etheostoma baileyi Page & Burr, 1982 (emerald darter)
 Etheostoma barbouri Kuehne & J. W. Small, 1971 (teardrop darter)
 Etheostoma barrenense Burr & Page, 1982 (splendid darter)
 Etheostoma basilare Page, Hardman & Near, 2003 (corrugated darter)
 Etheostoma bellator Suttkus & R. M. Bailey, 1993 (warrior darter)
 Etheostoma bellum Zorach, 1968 (orangefin darter)
 Etheostoma bison Ceas & Page, 1997 (buffalo darter)
 Etheostoma blennioides Rafinesque, 1819 (greenside darter)
 Etheostoma blennius C. H. Gilbert & Swain, 1887 (blenny darter)
 Etheostoma boschungi Wall & J. D. Williams, 1974 (slackwater darter)
 Etheostoma brevirostrum Suttkus & Etnier, 1991 (holiday darter)
 Etheostoma brevispinum (Coker, 1926) (Carolina fantail darter)
 Etheostoma burri Ceas & Page, 1997 (brook darter)
 Etheostoma caeruleum D. H. Storer, 1845 (rainbow darter)
 Etheostoma camurum (Cope, 1870) (bluebreast darter)
 Etheostoma cervus Powers & Mayden, 2003 (Chickasaw darter)
 Etheostoma chermocki Boschung, Mayden & Tomelleri, 1992 (vermilion darter)
 Etheostoma chienense Page & Ceas, 1992 (relict darter)
 Etheostoma chlorobranchium Zorach, 1972 (greenfin darter)
 Etheostoma chlorosomum (O. P. Hay, 1881) (bluntnose darter)
 Etheostoma chuckwachatte Mayden & R. M. Wood, 1993 (lipstick darter)
 Etheostoma cinereum D. H. Storer, 1845 (ashy darter)
 Etheostoma clinton Mayden & Layman, 2012 (beaded darter)
 Etheostoma collettei Birdsong & L. W. Knapp, 1969 (creole darter)
 Etheostoma collis (C. L. Hubbs & Cannon, 1935) (Carolina darter)
 Etheostoma colorosum Suttkus & R. M. Bailey, 1993 (coastal darter)
 Etheostoma coosae (Fowler, 1945) (Coosa darter)
 Etheostoma corona Page & Ceas, 1992 (crown darter)
 Etheostoma cragini C. H. Gilbert, 1885 (Arkansas darter)
 Etheostoma crossopterum Braasch & Mayden, 1985 (fringed darter)
 Etheostoma davisoni O. P. Hay, 1885 (Choctawhatchee darter)
 Etheostoma denoncourti Stauffer & van Snik, 1997 (golden darter)
 Etheostoma derivativum Page, Hardman & Near, 2003 (stone darter)
 Etheostoma ditrema Ramsey & Suttkus, 1965 (coldwater darter)
 Etheostoma douglasi R. M. Wood & Mayden, 1993 (Tuskaloosa darter)
 Etheostoma duryi Henshall, 1889 (black darter)
 Etheostoma edwini (C. L. Hubbs & Cannon, 1935) (brown darter)
 Etheostoma erythrozonum Switzer & R. M. Wood, 2009 (Meramec saddled darter)
 Etheostoma etnieri Bouchard, 1977 (cherry darter)
 Etheostoma etowahae R. M. Wood & Mayden, 1993 (Etowah darter)
 Etheostoma euzonum (C. L. Hubbs & J. D. Black, 1940) (Arkansas saddled darter)
 Etheostoma exile (Girard, 1859) (Iowa darter)
 Etheostoma faulkneri Sterling & Warren, 2020 (Yoknapatawpha darter)
 Etheostoma flabellare Rafinesque, 1819 (fantail darter)
 Etheostoma flavum Etnier & R. M. Bailey, 1989 (saffron darter)
 Etheostoma fonticola (D. S. Jordan & C. H. Gilbert, 1886) (fountain darter)
 Etheostoma forbesi Page & Ceas, 1992 (barrens darter)
 Etheostoma fragi Distler, 1968 (strawberry darter)
 Etheostoma fricksium Hildebrand, 1923 (savannah darter)
 Etheostoma fusiforme (Girard, 1854) (swamp darter)
 Etheostoma gore Mayden & Layman, 2012 (Cumberland darter)
 Etheostoma gracile (Girard, 1859) (slough darter)
 Etheostoma grahami (Girard, 1859) (Rio Grande darter)
 Etheostoma gutselli (Hildebrand, 1932) (Tuckasegee darter)
 Etheostoma histrio D. S. Jordan & C. H. Gilbert, 1887 (harlequin darter)
 Etheostoma hopkinsi (Fowler, 1945) (Christmas darter)
 Etheostoma inscriptum (D. S. Jordan & Brayton, 1878) (turquoise darter)
 Etheostoma jessiae (D. S. Jordan & Brayton, 1878) (blueside darter)
 Etheostoma jimmycarter Mayden & Layman, 2012 (bluegrass darter)
 Etheostoma jordani C. H. Gilbert, 1891 (greenbreast darter)
 Etheostoma juliae Meek, 1891 (yoke darter)
 Etheostoma kanawhae (Raney, 1941) (Kanawha darter)
 Etheostoma kantuckeense Ceas & Page, 1997 (Highland Rim darter)
 Etheostoma kennicotti (Putnam, 1863) (stripetail darter)
 Etheostoma lachneri Suttkus & R. M. Bailey, 1994 (Tombigbee darter)
 Etheostoma lawrencei Ceas & Burr, 2002 (headwater darter)
 Etheostoma lemniscatum Blanton, 2008 (tuxedo darter)
 Etheostoma lepidum (S. F. Baird & Girard, 1853) (greenthroat darter)
 Etheostoma longimanum D. S. Jordan, 1888 (longfin darter)
 Etheostoma lugoi S. M. Norris & W. L. Minckley, 1997 (tufa darter)
 Etheostoma luteovinctum C. H. Gilbert & Swain, 1887 (redband darter)
 Etheostoma lynceum O. P. Hay, 1885 (brighteye darter)
 Etheostoma maculatum Kirtland, 1840 (spotted darter)
 Etheostoma mariae (Fowler, 1947) (pinewoods darter)
 Etheostoma marmorpinnum Blanton & R. E. Jenkins, 2008 (marbled darter)
 Etheostoma maydeni Powers & Kuhajda, 2012 (redlips darter)
 Etheostoma microperca D. S. Jordan & C. H. Gilbert, 1888 (least darter)
 Etheostoma mihileze Mayden, 2010 (sunburst darter)
 Etheostoma moorei Raney & Suttkus, 1964 (yellowcheek darter)
 Etheostoma nebra Near & M. R. Thomas, 2015 (buck darter) 
 Etheostoma neopterum W. M. Howell & Dingerkus, 1978 (lollipop darter)
 Etheostoma nianguae C. H. Gilbert & Meek, 1887 (Niangua darter)
 Etheostoma nigripinne Braasch & Mayden, 1985 (blackfin darter)
 Etheostoma nigrum Rafinesque, 1820 (johnny darter)
 Etheostoma nuchale W. M. Howell & R. D. Caldwell, 1965 (watercress darter)
 Etheostoma obama Mayden & Layman, 2012 (spangled darter)
 Etheostoma obeyense Kirsch, 1892 (barcheek darter)
 Etheostoma occidentale Powers & Mayden, 2007 (West Rim darter)
 Etheostoma okaloosae (Fowler, 1941) (Okaloosa darter)
 Etheostoma olivaceum Braasch & Page, 1979 (sooty darter)
 Etheostoma olmstedi D. H. Storer, 1842 (tessellated darter)
 Etheostoma oophylax Ceas & Page, 1992 (guardian darter)
 Etheostoma orientale Powers & Mayden, 2007 (East Rim darter)
 Etheostoma osburni (C. L. Hubbs & Trautman, 1932) (candy darter)
 Etheostoma pallididorsum Distler & Metcalf, 1962 (paleback darter)
 Etheostoma parvipinne C. H. Gilbert & Swain, 1887 (goldstripe darter)
 Etheostoma percnurum R. E. Jenkins, 1994 (duskytail darter)
 Etheostoma perlongum C. L. Hubbs & Raney, 1946) (Waccamaw darter)
 Etheostoma phytophilum Bart & M. S. Taylor, 1999 (rush darter)
 Etheostoma planasaxatile Powers & Mayden, 2007 (duck darter)
 Etheostoma podostemone D. S. Jordan & O. P. Jenkins, 1889 (riverweed darter)
 Etheostoma pottsii (Girard, 1859) (Chihuahua darter)
 Etheostoma proeliare (O. P. Hay, 1881) (cypress darter)
 Etheostoma pseudovulatum Page & Ceas, 1992 (egg-mimic darter)
 Etheostoma punctulatum (Agassiz, 1854) (stippled darter)
 Etheostoma pyrrhogaster R. M. Bailey & Etnier, 1988 (firebelly darter)
 Etheostoma radiosum (C. L. Hubbs & J. D. Black, 1941) (orangebelly darter)
 Etheostoma rafinesquei Burr & Page, 1982 (Kentucky darter)
 Etheostoma ramseyi Suttkus & R. M. Bailey, 1994 (Alabama darter)
 Etheostoma raneyi Suttkus & Bart, 1994 (Yazoo darter)
 Etheostoma rubrum Raney & Suttkus, 1966 (bayou darter)
 Etheostoma rufilineatum (Cope, 1870) (redline darter)
 Etheostoma rupestre C. H. Gilbert & Swain, 1887 (rock darter)
 Etheostoma sagitta (D. S. Jordan & Swain, 1883) (arrow darter)
 Etheostoma saludae (C. L. Hubbs & Cannon, 1935) (saluda darter)
 Etheostoma scotti Bauer, Etnier & Burkhead, 1995 (Cherokee darter)
 Etheostoma segrex S. M. Norris & W. L. Minckley, 1997 (Río Salado darter)
 Etheostoma sellare (Radcliffe & W. W. Welsh, 1913) (Maryland darter)
 Etheostoma sequatchiense Burr, 1979 (Sequatchie darter)
 Etheostoma serrifer (C. L. Hubbs & Cannon, 1935) (sawcheek darter)
 Etheostoma simoterum (Cope, 1868) (snubnose darter)
 Etheostoma sitikuense Blanton, 2008 (Citico darter)
 Etheostoma smithi Page & Braasch, 1976 (slabrock darter)
 Etheostoma spectabile (Agassiz, 1854) (orangethroat darter)
 Etheostoma spilotum C. H. Gilbert, 1887 (Kentucky arrow darter, Cumberland Plateau darter)
 Etheostoma squamiceps D. S. Jordan, 1877 (spottail darter)
 Etheostoma stigmaeum (D. S. Jordan, 1877) (speckled darter)
 Etheostoma striatulum Page & Braasch, 1977 (striated darter)
 Etheostoma susanae (D. S. Jordan & Swain, 1883) (Cumberland darter)
 Etheostoma swaini (D. S. Jordan, 1884) (Gulf darter)
 Etheostoma swannanoa D. S. Jordan & Evermann, 1889 (Swannanoa darter)
 Etheostoma tallapoosae Suttkus & Etnier, 1991 (Tallapoosa darter)
 Etheostoma tecumsehi Ceas & Page, 1997 (Shawnee darter)
 Etheostoma teddyroosevelt Mayden & Layman, 2012 (highland darter)
 Etheostoma tennesseense Powers & Mayden, 2007 (Tennessee darter)
 Etheostoma tetrazonum (C. L. Hubbs & J. D. Black, 1940) (Missouri saddled darter)
 Etheostoma thalassinum (D. S. Jordan & Brayton, 1878) (seagreen darter)
 Etheostoma thompsoni Suttkus, Bart & Etnier, 2012 (gumbo darter)
 Etheostoma tippecanoe D. S. Jordan & Evermann, 1890 (Tippecanoe darter)
 Etheostoma trisella R. M. Bailey & W. J. Richards, 1963 (trispot darter)
 Etheostoma tuscumbia C. H. Gilbert & Swain, 1887 (Tuscumbia darter)
 Etheostoma uniporum Distler, 1968 (current darter)
 Etheostoma variatum Kirtland, 1838 (variegated darter)
 Etheostoma virgatum (D. S. Jordan, 1880) (striped darter)
 Etheostoma vitreum (Cope, 1870) (glassy darter)
 Etheostoma vulneratum (Cope, 1870) (wounded darter)
 Etheostoma wapiti Etnier & J. D. Williams, 1989 (boulder darter)
 Etheostoma whipplei (Girard, 1859) (redfin darter)
 Etheostoma zonale (Cope, 1868) (banded darter)
 Etheostoma zonifer C. L. Hubbs & Cannon, 1935) (backwater darter)
 Etheostoma zonistium R. M. Bailey & Etnier, 1988 (bandfin darter)

References

 
Etheostomatinae

Taxa named by Constantine Samuel Rafinesque
Freshwater fish genera